The article contains the information of the 2011–12 2nd Division football season. This is the 3rd rated football competition in Iran after the Azadegan League and Persian Gulf Cup.

The league will be composed of 28 teams divided into two divisions of 14 teams each, whose teams will be divided geographically.  Teams will play only other teams in their own division, once at home and once away for a total of 26 matches each.

In each group, the first two teams are promoted to Azadegan League, and two teams are relegated to 3rd Division plus the relegation playoff loser. In total, the league promotes 4 teams to Azadegan League and relegates 5 teams to 3rd Division.

The football league competition started from 8 September 2011.

Teams

Group A

Group B

Standings

Group A

Group B

Final

Championship final

Third place play-off

Relegation play-off

The loser will be relegated to 2012–13 Iran Football's 3rd Division

References

External links
 آیین نامه مسابقات لیگ دسته اول، دسته دوم و دسته سوم کشور فصل 91-90

League 2 (Iran) seasons
3